Cona may refer to:

Places
Cona, Veneto, a town and comune in Venice, Italy
Cona (Teramo), a quarter of Teramo, Italy
Cona Creek, Queensland, a locality and creek in Queensland, Australia
Cona County, Shannan Prefecture, Tibet, China
Cona, a populated place in the Tibet Autonomous Region
Cona Lake, Tibet

Acronyms
ConA, Concanavalin A, a lectin protein
Conference on National Affairs, a program operated by the YMCA Youth and Government program
Cultural Objects Name Authority, a project of the Getty Research Institute

Other uses
Fernandino Cona (1882–unknown), Italian general during World War II
Pascual Coña (late 1840s–1927), Chilean man who narrated Mapuche customs
Cona, a vacuum coffee maker designed by Abram Games

CONA (1991-Present), Florida based recording artist and multi-instrumentalist

See also 
Kona (disambiguation)